Nessco Building is a skyscraper in Tripoli, Libya. The 26 story building was completed in 2007.

See also
Skyscraper design and construction
List of tallest buildings in Africa

References

Buildings and structures in Tripoli, Libya
Commercial buildings completed in 2007
2007 establishments in Libya